Unseating is a political term which refers to a legislator who loses their seat in an election. A legislator who is unseated loses the right to sit in a legislative chamber. A landslide victory results in many legislators being unseated.

Canada 

 List of MPs who lost their seat in the 2011 Canadian federal election
 List of MPs who lost their seat in the 2015 Canadian federal election
 List of MPs who lost their seat in the 2019 Canadian federal election
 List of MPs who lost their seat in the 2021 Canadian federal election

France 

 List of MPs who lost their seat in the 2017 French legislative election
 List of MPs who lost their seat in the 2022 French legislative election

Germany 

 List of MPs who lost their seat in the 2021 German federal election

Russia 

 List of members of the 7th Russian State Duma who were not re-elected

United Kingdom 
Unseating influential Members of Parliament is a goal of opposition parties. MPs representing marginal constituencies are usually at higher risk of being unseated.

At the 1918 election following the First World War, the Liberal leader and leader of the opposition H. H. Asquith lost a seat he had held since 1886. A biographer said of this "the blow was crippling, a personal humiliation which destroyed his hope of exercising any influence on the peace settlement."

Chris Patten, Chairman of the Conservative Party, was unseated in 1992. Michael Portillo, widely expected to be the next Conservative leader, lost his seat at the 1997 general election, an event which coined the expression "Portillo moment".
At the 2015 general election, Ed Balls and Simon Hughes were unseated in political upsets. In 2019, the Liberal Democrat leader, Jo Swinson, was unseated by the Scottish National Party.

Lists 

 List of MPs who lost their seat in the 1997 United Kingdom general election
 List of MPs who lost their seat in the 2010 United Kingdom general election
 List of MPs who lost their seat in the 2015 United Kingdom general election
 List of MPs who lost their seat in the 2017 United Kingdom general election
 List of MPs who lost their seat in the 2019 United Kingdom general election

United States 
When an incumbent Member of Congress runs for re-election they may be unseated in the general election. This is more likely if the politician represents a swing state or swing district.

 Unseated members of the United States Congress

See also 

 Parliament

References 

Politics
Elections terminology
English words and phrases